Vazhappally copper plate (c. 882/83 AD) is a copper plate inscription in Malayalam language from Vazhappally, in the state of Kerala, south India. Recent scholarship puts the date of the plate in c. 882/83 AD.

The inscription is engraved on a single copper plate (with five lines on both sides) in an early form of Malayalam in Vattezhuthu script with some Grantha characters. The contents of the plate are incomplete. The inscription was discovered by V. Srinivasa Sastri from Talamana Illam near Changanassery. The plate is owned by Muvidathu Madham, Thiruvalla.

The record is dated to the twelfth regnal year of Chera Perumal king Rama Rajasekhara (882/83 AD).

 King Rajasekhara is described as "Sri, Raja Rajadhiraja, Parameswara Bhattaraka, Rajashekhara Deva" and "the Perumal Atikal".
 The copper plate describes a temple committee resolution by Thiruvatruvay Pathinettu Nattar and the Urar of Vazhappally in the presence of king Rajasekhara on a land grant for the daily worship in the Thiruvatruvay temple.
 The fines for those who obstruct the daily worship in the temple are also prescribed.
 Begins with the invocation "Namah Shivaya" ("Respect to Shiva") in place of the usual "Swasti Sri" ("Hail! Prosperity!").
 Also mentions a coin called "dinara".

The Vattezhuthu characters in the Vazhappally copper plate are noted for their similarity to the Madras Museum Plates of Jatila Varman Parantaka Pandya. The Grantha characters in the plate have a late character with respect to the Kasakudi and other early Pallava grants. The plate also resembles Quilon Syrian copper plates (mid-9th century AD) in script and language.

Chera Perumal king Rajasekhara is usually identified by scholars with Cheraman Perumal Nayanar, the venerated Shaiva (Nayanar) poet-musician.

Translation

References

External links 
 Mathew, Alex - Political identities in History (2006) Unpublished Doctoral Thesis (M. G. University)
History of Changanassery
History of Kerala
Vatteluttu
Malayalam inscriptions
9th century in law
Chera dynasty
Kerala history inscriptions
Vazhappally